Trichilia lecointei is a species of plant in the family Meliaceae. It is native to Pará state of northern Brazil and Guyana. It occurs in Jari Genetic Reserve and Monte Dourado National Park, in the Amazon River delta region. It is threatened by habitat loss.

References

lecointei
Flora of the Amazon
Flora of Guyana
Flora of Pará
Conservation dependent plants
Near threatened flora of South America
Taxonomy articles created by Polbot